RK Budućnost (Cyrillic: PК Будућност) is a handball club from Podgorica, Montenegro, which was champion of Montenegro for the two times. It is a part of Budućnost sport society.

History
During the most of their history, Budućnost played in the Second Yugoslav League. In the shadow of successful Women's handball team Budućnost, they played only two seasons in the First League during the SFR Yugoslavia and FR Yugoslavia era.

Successful period in the Budućnost history started after the Montenegrin independence. Budućnost became champion of the Second League 2006/07 and gets promotion to the First League.

With a lot of new players from the whole region, Budućnost won their first trophy of Montenegrin champion at the season 2008/09. Same success, club from Podgorica made one year later. They participated in qualifiers for the EHF Champions League, but after 2010 and a financial collapse, RK Budućnost was dissolved. 

In the season 2019–20, RK Budućnost was reactivated.

Trophies
Champion of Montenegro (2) 
2009, 2010.

First League seasons
In the SFR Yugoslavia and FR Yugoslavia/Serbia and Montenegro, RK Budućnost participated in the First League during the three seasons: 1990/91, 1991/92, 2000/01.

After the Montenegrin independence, Budućnost played in the Montenegrin First League during the seasons 2007/08, 2008/09, 2009/10.

European Cups
Budućnost played two seasons in the EHF European competitions:

2008/09 - EHF Challenge Cup

2009/10 - EHF Champions League / EHF Cup

Matches

Famous players
  Alen Muratović
 Blažo Lisičić
 Nenad Peruničić	
 Marko Rajković
 Igor Marković
 Victor Kovalenko
 Igor Bakić
 Nemanja Grbović	
 Žarko Marković
 Marko Lasica
 Rade Mijatović
 Mirko Milašević
 Žarko Pejović
 Goran Đukanović
 Alexandru Cioban
 Valeriy Myagkov
 Mirko Anđić
 Petar Koćalo
 Danijel Vukićević
 Mladen Ivanović
 Zoran Mihailović
 Ivan Rajičević
 Dragoslav Stojiljković

See also
SD Budućnost Podgorica

External links
Handball Federation of Montenegro
balkan-handball

Buducnost
Budućnost Podgorica